Peak Hour is an album by the English band Psychic TV, released in 1993.

Critical reception

AllMusic wrote: "Electro beats and trippy electronic sounds conspire with weird vocal loops and other effects to make some of the most psychedelic dance music since early Funkadelic." Exclaim! noted that "the key to Psychic TV is the nuances in the aural distance of the sound field; it (whatever lies deep within there) is what alters your brain chemistry and causes you to relax in the long run."

Credits and liner notes
Artwork By [Cover] - Plasma Art
Engineer - Dave Cat
Keyboards [Additional] - Gavin Redman
Mastered By - Keith
Mixed By [Additional], Producer [Additional] - Deep Fry, The Greedy Beat Syndicate
Performer - Andy Chatterley, Genesis P-Orridge, Anthony "Hugo" Longden, Matthew Best, Richard Schiessl, Sean Maher
Producer - Richard Schiessl
Written By - Psychic TV
Recorded in London, San Francisco, Nepal between March and June 1993.
Mixed in London and San Francisco July 1993.
Mastered at JTS.

Catalog numbers
CD: Temple Records TOPY 068 CD
12" vinyl: Temple Records TOPY 068
CD reissue: Tin Toy TTCD 013

Track listing

CD version
"E-Male" - 7:49
"Dreamlined" - 5:40
"L.I.E.S." - 4:13
"Tribal" - 13:26
"Pregnant Pause" - 1:00
"Pain" - 6:24
"Everything Has To Happen" - 5:46
"How Does E Feel?" - 6:10
"Re-Mind" - 7:25

12" vinyl version
Side A
"E-Male" - 7:49
"Dreamlined" - 5:40
"L.I.E.S." - 4:14
"Tribal" - 6:10
Side B
"Pain" - 6:24
"Everything Has To Happen" - 5:46
"How Does E Feel?" - 5:50
"Re-Mind" - 7:08

CD reissue version

"E-Male (ha hahahahheee oh that's funny)" - 7:49
"Dreamlined" - 5:40
"L.I.E.S." - 4:14
"Tribal" - 6:10
"Pain" - 6:24
"Everything Has To Happen" - 5:46
"How Does E Feel?" - 5:50
"Re-Mind" - 7:08
"Tribal coinci/dance mix" - 8:18
"Tribal analogue sex mix" - 8:38
"Godzilla "Return to the sea" Psychic TV remix" - 8:20

References

Psychic TV albums
1993 albums